Red Pill Blues is the sixth studio album by American band Maroon 5. It was released on November 3, 2017, through 222 and Interscope Records. This is the band's first release to feature multi-instrumentalist Sam Farrar, as an official member after he became a touring member in 2012, and also the last album to feature bassist Mickey Madden, before his departure from the band in 2020, which means this is their only album featured as 7-piece band to date. The title of the album refers to the science fiction term of taking the red pill or the blue pill, which originated from the 1999 sci-fi film The Matrix. The album is the follow-up to their fifth studio album V (pronounced: "five", 2014) and features guest appearances from Kendrick Lamar, Julia Michaels, SZA, ASAP Rocky, LunchMoney Lewis and Future.

Red Pill Blues received mixed reviews from music critics upon its release, and peaked at number two on the US Billboard 200. The album includes the singles "Don't Wanna Know", "Cold", "What Lovers Do", "Wait", and "Girls Like You". The first two singles, "Don't Wanna Know" and "Cold", are included on both of the album's deluxe and Japanese editions respectively. The third single "What Lovers Do", peaked within the top ten in twenty-five countries including Australia, Canada and the United States. The album's fourth single "Wait", received moderate success, peaking at number twenty-four in the United States, thirty-five on the Canadian Hot 100, and seventy-nine in the UK Singles. The fifth and final single from the reissued edition of the album "Girls Like You", was released in a new version featuring rapper Cardi B and peaked at number one on the US Billboard Hot 100, as well as in the top five in Australia and Canada. The band embarked on the Red Pill Blues Tour (2018–2019) in support of the album.

Background 
After touring in support of their fifth studio album V (2014) for over three years, Maroon 5 began planning a follow-up to V. After embarking on a short rescheduled headlining tour in North America in March 2017, the band recording new material for a sixth album at Conway Recording Studios in Los Angeles, California. The band later posted teaser gifs and videos of members in the studio on their social media accounts in late March.

At the 2017 Teen Choice Awards, held on August 13, 2017, Maroon 5 was honored with the Decade Award. In his acceptance speech, frontman Adam Levine confirmed that their sixth album would be released in November. Levine later confirmed this in an interview with Zane Lowe on Apple Music radio station Beats 1. On October 4, 2017, the band revealed the album's name, Red Pill Blues, and announced the pre-order for the album on October 6. Describing the meaning between this album and the band's first album Songs About Jane (2002), Levine said: "I think this album and the first album are probably the most connected. This album seems to me like a cousin to the first album, there’s a relationship kind of like book-ended all the ones in between."

Artwork 
The album cover art for Red Pill Blues was created by American photographer Travis Schneider and is inspired by filters featured on the mobile app Snapchat. The cover depicts all seven members of Maroon 5 pictured on polaroid photographs with a filter on their faces. "We all use Snapchat, and the filters have become a huge part of the culture," frontman Adam Levine told Billboard in an October 2017 interview. "We thought it would be funny to take some more straight-ahead band photos and sprinkle in a little fun." Guitarist James Valentine added by saying: "It's like, a part of the zeitgeist now. Adam [Levine] and his wife, they just love trading photos when we're touring and stuff. They're always doing those filter faces to each other, so I think it rose out of that. Adam always has fun with that."

It also won the bronze award at the 2018 Shorty Awards, with both the album's cover art for Best Use of Snapchat and the wallpaper promotion for Best Influencer and Celebrity Snapchat Campaign.

Singles 
Red Pill Blues was preceded by two commercial stand-alone releases, which were later included on both the deluxe and Japanese editions of the album. The first stand-alone single was "Don't Wanna Know" featuring American rapper Kendrick Lamar, was released digital retailers on October 12, 2016, and charted at No. 6 on the US Billboard Hot 100 and topped the Adult Top 40, Adult Contemporary, and Hot 100 Airplay charts. A music video for the song's original version premiered exclusively on The Today Show on October 14, 2016.

A second stand-alone single, "Cold" featuring American rapper Future, was released on February 14, 2017, and charted at No. 16 on the Hot 100 and No. 5 on the Adult Top 40 chart. The song's music video premiered the day after, February 15.

"What Lovers Do", featuring American R&B singer SZA was released by the band on August 30, 2017, as the third single from the album. A lyric video was uploaded on September 15, 2017, while the music video for the song was released on September 28. The single peaked at number nine on the Hot 100 and became the band's thirteenth top ten hit on the chart.

James Valentine announced on Twitter that "Wait" would be the fourth single from the album. The song was officially released to US contemporary hit radio on January 16, 2018, as the album's fourth single. It peaked at number 24 on the Hot 100.

A remix version of "Girls Like You" featuring Cardi B served as the fifth and final single and was released on May 30, 2018. It was the first single from the re-release of the album and the most successful single. The song peaked at number one on the Hot 100 chart for seven weeks, becoming Maroon 5's fourth and Cardi B's third number-one. It spent 33 weeks in the top 10, tying both with Ed Sheeran's "Shape of You" and Post Malone and Swae Lee's "Sunflower" for the longest top 10 run in the chart's archives at the time. It became the first pop song to reach number one since "Havana" by Camila Cabello in January 2018. "Girls Like You" set a record for most weeks at No. 1 on the Adult Contemporary chart, remaining atop this chart for 36 consecutive weeks.

Promotional singles 
"Help Me Out", featuring American singer-songwriter Julia Michaels, was released on October 6, 2017, as the first promotional single of the album. The second promotional single, "Whiskey" featuring American rapper ASAP Rocky, was released to digital retailers on October 20, 2017. Before becoming the fourth single, "Wait" was initially released as the third promotional single on October 31.

Promotion and touring 

On November 7, 2017, Maroon 5 played a concert at the iHeartRadio Theater in Burbank, California, to commemorate the release of the album. On October 26, the band announced they would embark on the Red Pill Blues Tour. The tour began on May 30, 2018, in Tacoma, Washington and ended on December 31, 2019, in Las Vegas, Nevada, comprising 65 shows. The took place in North America from May to October 2018, with Michaels as the tour's opening act.

On August 28, 2018, Maroon 5 announced new dates for the tour in 2019 in Australia, Asia and Europe. Artists Cxloe (Australia) and Sigrid (Europe), were announced as the tour's opening acts.

Critical reception 

Red Pill Blues received mixed reviews from music critics. On Metacritic, the album has a score of 58 from eight reviews, indicating "generally mixed or average reviews". Stephen Thomas Erlewine from AllMusic wrote that after setting aside the album's title and cover, Red Pill Blues can be taken as a "sleek, assured affair, one that sustains a seductive neon-streaked mood from beginning to end." He found their "modern sheen" to contain "strong song foundations" that in turn makes it not "play like a collective rhythmic and melodic hook in search of an ear: each cut unfolds with its own internal logic, with the different textures playing nicely off each other." Entertainment Weeklys Madison Vain described the album as the "best and most cohesive set of the decade" due to the group collaborating with a "murderers’ row of Hot 100 collaborators" that "ensures there's hardly a stale moment." Rolling Stones Jon Dolan found Adam Levine capably nuancing the "Top 40 old soul navigating whatever the pop-music moment throws his way" role as he "works well alongside young talent" to prove himself as a "pliant star of Jacksonian ease and Stingly self-assurance." Taylor Weatherby of Billboard wrote that the record "presents the most electronic production the band has seen to date" in the "classic Maroon 5 fashion" through "supplementing the synthy bass lines with irresistible beats and smooth vocals," while commending the collaborations and the lyrical portrayals of "relationship talk." Ludovic Hunter-Tilney from the Financial Times said that although feminist listeners "may struggle to discern solidarity" in certain suggestive track couplets, the album still "makes its way through the minefield" since its "smooth high vocals and catchy tunes" gives the songs "a degree of charm" while its "deft production lends depth to the slick music."

Jayson Greene of Pitchfork affirmed the group's "shrewd and easy touch with soft rock" in "Best 4 U", but felt that the album's "utter lack of libido" made it "so difficult to even finish" especially since "soft rock and sex have a tricky relationship, and so do sex and Hot 100 pop." Michael Hann from The Guardian noted Maroon 5's continuation of producing "impeccably structured pop songs" with "Help Me Out", but felt that Red Pill Blues was not an R&B album "in any remotely experimental way." Writing for The Times, Will Hodgkinson commented that despite the "vacuity of the music and the words," whose former was "made up of noises from Maroon 5's pop machine" and whose latter was "unconvincing expressions of love and sensuality delivered passionlessly by Levine," the record was nevertheless "unpretentious and actually quite fun." Slant Magazines Zachary Hoskins mentioned that Maroon 5 has "rebranded themselves as Daryl Hall and six John Oates—or at least a watered-down Chromeo" with the record's release whose "retro sound suits them," yet felt that it still has its share of "bland, underachieving grist for suburban shopping centers and rhythmic pop radio" with Levine's "digitally augmented vocal acrobatics" still as likely to "irritate as ingratiate."

 Accolades 

 Commercial performance 
In the United States, Red Pill Blues debuted at number two on the Billboard 200, with 122,000 album-equivalent units, of which 94,000 were pure album sales, becoming the band's sixth top ten album in the country. The album was kept off the top spot by Sam Smith's The Thrill of It All. By the end of the year, Red Pill Blues had accumulated 596,000 album-equivalent units in the country, with 185,000 being pure sales. On May 17, 2018, Red Pill Blues was certified Platinum by the Recording Industry Association of America for combined sales and album-equivalent units of over 1,000,000 units in the United States.

It is also Maroon 5's sixth top ten album in Australia, opening at number seven on the ARIA Albums Chart. The album entered the Canadian Albums Chart at number two, becoming their sixth top five entry in Canada. Elsewhere, it debuted at number six on the New Zealand Albums Chart, and at number 12 on the UK Albums Chart.

 Track listing Notes  signifies an additional producer
  signifies a co-producerSample credits"What Lovers Do" contains elements of "Sexual", written by Oladayo Olatunji, Victor Rådström and Elina Stridh.

 Credits and personnel 

 Personnel Maroon 5Adam Levine – lead vocals, rhythm guitar, songwriting, executive production
Jesse Carmichael – keyboards, synthesizers, rhythm guitar, backing vocals
Mickey Madden – bass
James Valentine – lead guitar, backing vocals
Matt Flynn – drums, percussion, electronic drums
PJ Morton – keyboards, synthesizers, piano, backing vocals
Sam Farrar – rhythm guitar, keyboards, synthesizers, samples, bass, backing vocals, programming, productionAdditional personnel'

 The Arcade – songwriting, production 
 Afterhrs – production
 Nick Bailey – production
 Alex Ben-Abdallah – songwriting
 Ben Billions – production
 Benny Blanco – songwriting, production 
 Julien Bunetta – songwriting, production
 Dustin Bushnell – songwriting
 Cirkut – production
 Diplo – songwriting, production
 Jason Evigan – production
 Ian Franzino – songwriting
 Teddy Geiger – songwriting
 James Alan Ghaleb – songwriting
 Andrew Haas – songwriting
 Brittany Talia Hazzard – songwriting
 King Henry – songwriting, production 
 Alexander Izquerdio – songwriting
 Jacob Kasher Hindlin – songwriting, production
 J Kash – executive production
 Kendrick Lamar – guest vocals, songwriting 
 Louie Lastic – production
 LunchMoney Lewis – guest vocals, songwriting 
 Ammar Malik – songwriting
 Julia Michaels – guest vocals, songwriting
 Ryan Ogren – production
 Oladayo Olatunji – songwriting
 OzGo – songwriting, production 
 Noah Passavoy – production
 Phil Paul – songwriting, production 
 Victor Rådström – songwriting
 Charlie Puth – songwriting, production
 Ricky Reed – songwriting, production
 ASAP Rocky – guest vocals, songwriting 
 John Ryan – songwriting, production
 Tinashe Sibanda – songwriting
 Gian Stone – songwriting
 Elina Stridh – songwriting
 SZA – guest vocals, songwriting 
 TMS – songwriting, production 
 Justin Tranter – songwriting
 Randy Merrill – mastering
 Jared Watson – songwriting
 Isaiah Tejada – keyboards, synthesizers
 Kenneth Whalum – tenor saxophone on "Closure"

Recording locations

 Conway Recording Studios (Los Angeles) – recording 
 MixStar Studios (Virginia Beach) – mixing 
 Westlake Recording Studios (Los Angeles) – recording 
 Chumba Meadows (Tarzana) – recording 
 The Venice Studio (Venice, CA) – recording 
 Electric Lady Studios (New York) – recording 
 Henson Recording Studios – recording 
 Wolf Cousins Studios (Stockhold, Sweden) – recording 
 Glenwood Place (California) – recording 
 Matzah Ball Studios (New York) – recording 
 Inner Child Records (London) – recording 
 Sterling Sound (New York) – mastering

Charts

Weekly charts

Year-end charts

Decade-end charts

Certifications

References 

2017 albums
222 Records albums
Interscope Records albums
Maroon 5 albums
Soft rock albums by American artists
Albums produced by Diplo
Albums produced by Sam Farrar
Albums produced by Cirkut
Albums produced by Benny Blanco
Albums produced by Jason Evigan
Albums produced by TMS (production team)